Osiriaca is a monotypic moth genus of the family Crambidae described by Francis Walker in 1866. Its only species, Osiriaca ptousalis, described by the same author in 1859, is known from Australia.

References

Spilomelinae
Moths of Australia
Monotypic moth genera
Crambidae genera
Taxa named by Francis Walker (entomologist)